Freedom Is Paradise (Russian: СЭР, acronym for Свобода Это Раи, Svoboda Eto Rai) is a 1989 Soviet Union film directed by Sergey Bodrov. It won the Grand Prix des Amériques, the main prize at the Montreal World Film Festival, and brought Bodrov international acclaim.

References

External links 

1989 films
Soviet adventure drama films
1980s Russian-language films